The Swordsmen and Sorcerers' Guild of America or SAGA was an informal group of American fantasy authors active from the 1960s through the 1980s, noted for their contributions to the "Sword and Sorcery" kind of heroic fantasy, itself a subgenre of fantasy. When it developed a serious purpose that was to promote the popularity and respectability of Sword and Sorcery fiction.

History
According to Lin Carter, the guiding force behind the group, SAGA was founded in the mid-1960s by the trio of himself, L. Sprague de Camp, and John Jakes out of a shared interest in the then-neglected subgenre of heroic fantasy. Originally it was little more than an in-group, with members gathering for drinks at science fiction conventions and bestowing pompous, complicated titles on each other. Carter was named "Purple Druid of the Gibbering Horde of the Slime Pits of Zugthakya," de Camp "Supreme Sadist of the Reptile Men of Yag," and Jakes "Ambassador-without-Portfolio to the Partly Squamous, Partly Rugose Vegetable Things of the South Polar City of Nugyubb-Glaa." Membership was soon extended to other authors sharing their taste for fantasy, such as Michael Moorcock, who was styled "Veiled Thaumaturge of the Mauve Barbarians of Ningg". The group remained fairly informal, with few expectations of its members; Moorcock has noted he "wasn't really an active member."

Several sword and sorcery anthologies edited by L. Sprague de Camp for Pyramid Books and Putnam from 1963 to 1970 featured stories by SAGA members along with other, usually earlier fantasists. In  The Spell of Seven (Pyramid Books, 1965),  four of the seven pieces were by members. Another early anthology including works by members of the group was Swords Against Tomorrow (Signet Books, 1970), a paperback original edited by Robert Hoskins. It comprised one novella and three novelettes by SAGA members and a novelette by Leigh Brackett. SAGA later showcased the work of its members in the Flashing Swords! anthology series edited by Carter and published by Dell Books from 1973 to 1981.

Carter and SAGA created and sponsored the Gandalf Awards administered by the annual World Science Fiction Convention according to the Hugo Award procedures. From 1974 to 1981 the Gandalf Grand Master Award was annually presented to one person for life achievement in high fantasy writing. (The first recognized J. R. R. Tolkien, deceased one year earlier, and SAGA members won the next four, and the last three winners never became members.) The Gandalf Award for Book-Length Fantasy was conferred in 1978 and 1979 upon one book published during the previous calendar year. It was dropped by Worldcon because it partly duplicated the Hugo Award for Best Novel.

With the collapse of Carter’s health in the 1980s the anthology series, the Gandalf award, and likely SAGA itself all went into abeyance.

Membership
Membership was extended by invitation to selected living heroic fantasy authors. Most early members were celebrated more for their science fiction writings than for fantasy, but SAGA membership depended solely on fantasy credentials. Early members and the works that formed the basis of their membership included:
 Poul Anderson – novels The Broken Sword and Three Hearts and Three Lions
 Lin Carter – "Thongor" series, inaugurated by The Wizard of Lemuria
 L. Sprague de Camp – the Pusadian series and the revival and promotion (with Carter) of Robert E. Howard's creation Conan the Barbarian 
 John Jakes – "Brak the Barbarian" series
 Fritz Leiber – Fafhrd and the Gray Mouser series
 Michael Moorcock – Elric of Melniboné series
 Andre Norton – Witch World series
 Jack Vance – Dying Earth series

Later members included:
 C. J. Cherryh – "Morgaine" series
 Diane Duane – novel The Door into Fire (subsequently the "Middle Kingdoms" series)
 Craig Shaw Gardner – "Ebenezum" series
 Avram Davidson – "Vergil Magus" series and numerous other works
 Katherine Kurtz – "Deryni" series
 Tanith Lee – "Birthgrave" series
 Roger Zelazny – "Dilvish" and "Amber" series

Anthologies
The works of SAGA as a group were showcased in the following anthologies:
 The Spell of Seven, ed. L. Sprague de Camp (1965)
 Swords Against Tomorrow, ed. Robert Hoskins (1970)
 Flashing Swords!, ed. Lin Carter
 Flashing Swords! #1 (1973)
 Flashing Swords! #2 (1975)
 Flashing Swords! #3: Warriors and Wizards (1976)
 Flashing Swords! #4: Barbarians and Black Magicians (1977)
 Flashing Swords! #5: Demons and Daggers (1981)

See also
Gandalf Award

References

Science fiction organizations
Defunct organizations based in the United States
American writers' organizations
Arts organizations established in the 1960s
Arts organizations disestablished in the 20th century
1960s establishments in the United States
1980s disestablishments in the United States